Blackhillock Substation is an electrical substation located in the north east of Scotland, near the town of Keith in Moray.

It is owned and operated by Scottish Southern Electricity Network (SSEN).  Covering an area the size of 24 football pitches, it is as of January 2019, the UK's largest substation and Europe's second biggest.

Construction began in early 2015 to upgrade the existing substation so it could accommodate the new 1,200 MW Caithness - Moray Link. The £1bn construction project had four main elements: 400kV and 132kV gas-insulated substations, one 275kV air-insulated substation, a High Voltage Direct Current (HVDC) converter for the Caithness - Moray subsea link and a HVDC underground cable from the substation to Portgordon.  In January 2019 construction and commissioning were completed making it the UK's largest operating substation.  It is seen as integral to the UK electricity grid as the north of Scotland generates much renewable energy via windfarms. The upgrade was primarily done to accommodate the Beatrice Windfarm.

A 300 MW / 600 MWh grid battery started construction at the site in 2023.

See also 

 Electrical Generation in the UK
 Renewable energy in the United Kingdom

References

National Grid (Great Britain)
Converter stations
Buildings and structures in Moray
Electric power infrastructure in Scotland